In US parliamentary procedure, the previous question (also known as "calling for the question", "calling the question", "close debate", "calling for a vote", "vote now", or other similar forms) is generally used as a motion to end debate on a pending proposal and bring it to an immediate vote. The meaning of this specialized motion has nothing to do with any question previously considered by the assembly.

In the United States Senate and Commonwealth parliaments, a motion for "cloture", or "closure", is used instead to end debate. In those bodies, the "previous question" has a different use and is rarely used or not used at all.

History 
The "previous question" was initially used in the English Parliament in 1604. At that time, use of this motion was intended not to end debate, but to suppress the main question for the rest of the session (similar to an objection to the consideration of a question). It could be debated and when put to a vote, an affirmative vote on the previous question would put the main motion to a immediate vote, while a negative vote on the previous question would end consideration of the main motion altogether for the day. Although rarely used, this same form of the motion still exists in Parliament.

The United States Congress gradually changed the previous question to a different motion for its own purposes. Initially, its use in Congress was similar to that in parliament. Then in 1805, Congress made it undebatable. Throughout the 19th century, Congress made additional changes to this motion. By the end of the 19th century in the United States, it had become a motion to close debate and to proceed to voting on the main question.

Explanation and use 
To end debate, a motion for the previous question could be adopted. It is often proposed by a member saying, "I call [for] the question", although the formal wording is, "I move the previous question." The motion for the "previous question" has nothing to do with the last question previously considered by the assembly.

Another use of this motion could be to stop the moving of amendments on any amendable motion. It also prevents the making of other subsidiary motions like commit or postpone.

Robert's Rules of Order Newly Revised (RONR) 
Under Robert's Rules of Order Newly Revised (the book used by most organizations in the United States), when a motion for the previous question is made (whether formally or in a nonstandard form such as "calling the question", "close debate", or "calling for a vote"), a two-thirds vote (or unanimous consent) is required to end debate. A single member cannot force the end of debate. Also, interrupting someone by yelling out "Question!" or "Call the question!" is not appropriate (it has to be made by obtaining the floor like other motions).

This motion is not debatable because having debate on such a motion would defeat its purpose.

In ordinary societies, the rationale for a two-thirds vote to end debate and move to a vote on the pending question is to protect the rights of the minority (and it may protect the rights of the majority if only one person was improperly allowed to stop debate).

Mason's Manual of Legislative Procedure 
Most state legislatures in the United States use Mason's Manual of Legislative Procedure. This book also provides for the motion of the previous question.

The Standard Code of Parliamentary Procedure 
The Standard Code of Parliamentary Procedure does not have the "previous question". Instead this book has the motion to "close debate", the motion to "vote immediately", or the motion to "close debate and vote immediately". Regardless of the terminology, a two-thirds vote is required to end debate.

Use in the United States Congress 

In the United States House, most major legislation comes to the floor under a special rule approved by the Rules Committee, and then the House, which defines the terms and limits of debate for that resolution. After debate has begun, the previous question may be used to end debate (which requires only a simple majority of voting Members to pass).

Instead of a motion for the previous question, the United States Senate uses a motion to limit debate, called cloture. This requires three-fifths of the total number of Senators.  It does not immediately end debate on the pending question, but rather imposes strict limitations on debate.

Use in other parliaments 

In the House of Commons of the United Kingdom, the use of the previous question is the same as was originally developed (by suppressing the question instead of closing debate), although its use in this regard is very rare. The Chair responds to a motion for the previous question with "The question is, That the Question be not now put." The Select Committee on the Modernisation of the House of Commons criticized this procedure as "totally incomprehensible", and proposed in its place a simplified motion to "proceed to the next business". Instead of the previous question, a closure motion is used to end debate.

The Australian Senate has the "previous question" in its original form from the British Parliament (by suppressing the question instead of closing debate) and is also very rarely used by this body. Instead, the "closure" motion is used to end debate in both the Senate and the House of Representatives. Closure is also used in groups outside parliament in Australia.

In the Parliament of Canada, the previous question has a similar older form. Also in this body, the "closure" motion is used to end debate by requiring that the house proceed to voting at the end of the sitting in which the "closure" motion is adopted.

See also 
 Debate (parliamentary procedure)
 Table (parliamentary procedure) – a term that also has different meanings in British and American use

References